Mordechai Rotenberg (born 1932) is an Israeli professor of social work at the Hebrew University of Jerusalem.

Biography
Mordechai Rotenberg was born in Breslau, Germany (today Wrocław, Poland). His father was from Warsaw, descended from Rabbi Yitzchak Meir Alter, the founder of the Gur Hasidic sect.  His father owned a publishing house in Breslau. In 1939, on the eve of World War II, the family immigrated to Palestine. Rotenberg's father opened a small printing press in Jerusalem. Rotenberg grew up in a Haredi household, with three brothers and a sister.

In 1960, he graduated from the Hebrew University with a BA in education and sociology from the School of Social Work.  In 1962, he received his MSW from New York University. In 1969, he was awarded a Ph.D. in social welfare and social psychology at University of California, Berkeley.

In 1970, Rotenberg joined the faculty of the Hebrew University of Jerusalem, becoming a full professor in 1980. He founded a new sub-discipline in psychology and religion.  He is the author of ten books, which have been translated into English, French, Portuguese and Japanese. Rotenberg has taught at University of Pennsylvania, University of California, Berkeley, the Jewish Theological Seminary, City University of New York and Yeshiva University.

Clinical approach
Rotenberg has developed innovative theories based on psychological interpretations of Hasidic and Midrashic concepts. He describes his approach as "re-biography", i.e.,  "rereading one's biography so it becomes possible to live with the text." In an interview with Haaretz newspaper he said: "All of life is a text, and I am proposing a new term - recomposition, rewriting the melody of life. You do not have to erase the past, but it can be re-composed, and to that end I cite examples from the Gemara."

Tzimtzum paradigm

Rotenberg has adopted the Kabbalistic-Hasidic tzimtzum paradigm, which he believes has significant implications for clinical therapy. According to this paradigm, God's "self-contraction" to vacate space for the world serves as a model for human behavior and interaction. The tzimtzum model promotes a unique community-centric approach which contrasts starkly with the language of Western psychology.

Awards
In 2009, Rotenberg was awarded the Israel Prize for social work, in connection with his research in social welfare.

Published works
Damnation and Deviance: The Protestant Ethic and the Spirit of Failure
Rewriting the Self: Psychotherapy and Midrash
The Yetzer: A Kabbalistic Psychology of Eroticism and Human Sexuality
Hasidic Psychology: Making Space for Others
Creativity and Sexuality: A Kabbalistic Experience
Between Rationality and Irrationality: The Jewish Psychotherapeutic System
Dialogue With Deviance
The Trance of Terror, Psycho-Religious FundaMentalism: Roots and Remedies
Dia-logo Therapy: Psychonarration and PaRDeS
Re-Biographing and Deviance: Psychotherapeutic Narrativism and the Midrash

See also 
List of Israel Prize recipients

References

External links
 Mordechai Rotenberg's Dia-logo Therapy: A New Approach to Dialogical Psychotherapy
 Books by Mordechai Rotenberg

1932 births
Living people
Israel Prize in social work recipients
Israeli social workers
German social workers
Israeli psychologists
Paul Baerwald School of Social Work and Social Welfare alumni
Academic staff of Paul Baerwald School of Social Work and Social Welfare
New York University School of Social Work alumni
UC Berkeley School of Social Welfare alumni
Jewish emigrants from Nazi Germany to Mandatory Palestine
People from the Province of Lower Silesia